American Christian post-grunge band 12 Stones has released five studio albums, one extended play and 14 singles.

Albums

Studio albums

Extended plays

Singles

Songs in other media 

 "Broken" was the theme song for WWE Judgment Day in 2002.
 "My Life" was featured on the soundtrack of The Scorpion King in 2002.
 "Crash" was the theme song for Al Snow in 2001.
 "Home" was used for the WWE Desire video for Kurt Angle.
 "Running Out of Pain" and "Back Up" were used in Cheating Death, Stealing Life: The Eddie Guerrero Story.
 "Back Up" was used as one track for the 2002 video game Tiger Woods PGA Tour 2003. and for the WWE Triple H vs. Shawn Michaels Hell in a Cell promo.
 "Let Go" was recorded for the 2003 Daredevil soundtrack
 "Shadows" was used in a trailer for the film Pirates of the Caribbean: Dead Man's Chest.
 "Photograph" appeared on the Elektra movie soundtrack 2005.
 "Adrenaline" was used in the World's Strongest Man competition and as the Detroit Red Wings 2009 Playoffs song.
 "Anthem for the Underdog" and "Adrenaline" are featured in the films Never Back Down & Never Surrender. Also was featured in NASCAR 2011: The Game.
 "Anthem for the Underdog" is used as the walk-up batting song for Corey Hart of the Milwaukee Brewers.
 "We Are One" was used as the theme song for the former NXT Rookies faction in WWE, called The Nexus, in the opening video montage for the Washington Capitals, as a walk-on song for professional darts player Paul Nicholson, and as a playoff pump-up song for the Philadelphia Flyers.

References 

Discographies of American artists